Henry Hobart (March 22, 1888 – 1951) was an American film producer during the late silent and early sound eras in the motion picture era. Initially, he was president of Distinctive Productions, but later formed his own independent production company, Henry Hobart Productions. All three of the silent films he produced for his company were distributed by First National Pictures. In 1928, Hobart would go to work for First National, and then would move over to the newly formed RKO Radio Pictures after the advent of talking pictures in 1929.

Filmography
(as per AFI's database)

References

External links

1888 births
1951 deaths
Film producers from New York (state)
People from Brooklyn